The 1941 Illinois Fighting Illini football team was an American football team that represented the University of Illinois during the 1941 Big Ten Conference football season.  In their 29th and final season under head coach Robert Zuppke, the Illini compiled a 2–6 record and finished in last place in the Big Ten Conference. Tackle Nate Johnson was selected as the team's most valuable player.

Schedule

References

Illinois
Illinois Fighting Illini football seasons
Illinois Fighting Illini football